Loropetalum is a genus of four species of shrubs or small trees in the witch-hazel family, Hamamelidaceae, native to China, Japan, and south-eastern Asia.

Description
Flowers are produced in clusters during spring and are similar to those of the closely related witch-hazel. Each flower consists of four to six (depending on species) slender strap shaped petals 1–2 cm long.

Taxonomy
Loropetalum is placed in tribe Loropetaleae, subfamily Hamamelidoideae, family Hamamelidaceae of the Saxifragales.

Etymology
The name Loropetalum refers to the shape of the flowers and comes from the Greek loron meaning strap and petalon meaning petal.

Species
The species are:
Loropetalum chinense - white-flowering variety up to 3.7 m tall, pink-flowering variety up to 1.5 m tall
Loropetalum flavum - yellow flowers
Loropetalum lanceum - up to 13 m tall, white flowers
Loropetalum subcordatum - up to 12 m tall

References

Bibliography

 
 
 
 San Marcos Growers: Loropetalum

External links
 
 

Hamamelidaceae
Saxifragales genera